Brocēni Municipality was a municipality in Courland, Latvia. As of 2020, the population was 5,633.

History 
The municipality was formed in 2001 by merging Blīdene parish, Remte parish and Brocēni town with its countryside territory, the administrative centre being Brocēni. In 2009 the municipality absorbed Gaiķi parish as well. In 2010 Ciecere parish was created from the countryside territory of Brocēni town. On 1 July 2021, the municipality was merged with Saldus Municipality. The name of the new municipality is Saldus Municipality.

Geography 
The district is located to the east of the city Saldus. Limestone is mined at Lake Cieceres and at Brocēni. The railway line from Riga to Liepāja runs through the district in a west-east direction.

See also 
 Administrative divisions of Latvia

References

External links 
 

 
Former municipalities of Latvia